The Chama cha Mariamu Mtakatifu (Community of St. Mary of Nazareth and Calvary), (CMM) is a large Anglican religious order operating within the Anglican Church of Tanzania, and with its headquarters at Masasi, Tanzania.

History
Female religious were first introduced to Tanzania by clergy missionaries of the Universities' Mission to Central Africa, working in conjunction with the sisters of the Community of the Sacred Passion (CSP). The Order was formally recognised in 1946, and then in 1968 gained independence from CSP, and became the autonomous CMM. Today the sisters focus their work on caring for parish churches, administering and teaching in primary schools, and outreach to hospitals, prisons, and the disadvantaged. They engage in agriculture, and also produce community wares for sale, including vestments, altar breads, and candles.

Structure
The Order reported around 120 sisters in membership at the start of 2012. There is a Sister Superior for each convent, or regional group of nearby convents. At the head of the Order is an elected Reverend Mother Superior - currently Reverend Mother Gloria Prisca CMM (elected 2004). There is a Bishop Visitor, who is one of the diocesan bishops of the Anglican Church of Tanzania.

Convents
The mother house is The Convent, Kilimani, in Masasi, Tanzania. There are twelve convents in total, eleven in Tanzania, and one in Zambia, where the Order is seeking to expand. Mass is offered daily, and the sisters (at all convents) recite a four-fold daily office of Morning Prayer, Midday Prayer, Evening Prayer, and Night Prayer (Compline). The current convents are located at (or near to) the following locations, which are all in Tanzania unless stated otherwise:

 Dar es Salaam
 Kilimani (mother house)
 Korogwe
 Kwa Mkono Handeni
 Liuli
 Mkushi (Zambia)
 Mtandi
 Mtwara
 Newala
 Njombe
 Sayuni Msima
 Tanga

References
Anglican Religious Communities Yearbook:  2004-2005.  Norwich:  Canterbury Press, 2003.
Anglican Religious Life:  2012-13.  Norwich:  Canterbury Press, 2011.

External links
Information from Anglican Communion office

Anglican orders and communities
Christian organizations established in 1946
Anglicanism in Tanzania
1946 establishments in Tanganyika